Ingo Euler (born 27 November 1971, in Freiburg im Breisgau) is a German rower. Together with his double sculls partner Bernhard Rühling Ingo Euler dominated German lightweight sculling in the late 1990s and early 2000s (decade) and competed in the 1996 (with Peter Uhrig), 2000 (with Bernhard Rühling) and 2004 (with Manuel Brehmer) Olympic Games in the Lightweight Double Sculls, his best olympic result was 4th place at the Sydney Olympics in 2000.

References 
 
 

1971 births
Living people
Sportspeople from Freiburg im Breisgau
Rowers at the 1996 Summer Olympics
Rowers at the 2000 Summer Olympics
Rowers at the 2004 Summer Olympics
Olympic rowers of Germany
World Rowing Championships medalists for Germany
German male rowers
20th-century German people
21st-century German people